Tatsushi (written: 達司 or 立嗣) is a masculine Japanese given name. Notable people with the name include:

, Japanese footballer
, Japanese baseball pitcher
, Japanese film director and actor

Japanese masculine given names